Kael Alejandro Becerra Rojas (born 4 November 1985 in Santiago) is a Chilean athlete specializing in the sprinting events.

Personal bests
Outdoor
100 metres – 10.26	s (+1.4 m/s) (Bogotá, Colombia 2011)
200 metres – 20.77	 s (+1.2 m/s) (Bogotá, Colombia 2006)

Indoor
60 metres – 6.61 s (Valencia, Spain 2007)

Competition record

External links

1985 births
Living people
Chilean male sprinters
Sportspeople from Santiago
Athletes (track and field) at the 2007 Pan American Games
Athletes (track and field) at the 2011 Pan American Games
Pan American Games competitors for Chile
South American Games silver medalists for Chile
South American Games bronze medalists for Chile
South American Games medalists in athletics
Competitors at the 2002 South American Games
Competitors at the 2006 South American Games
21st-century Chilean people